Marina Andreevna Pupenina, known by her pseudonym Marina Aleksandrova (born 29 August 1982) is a Russian actress, best known for her role as Catherine the Great in the television series Ekaterina. She is an Honored Artist of the Russian Federation (2016).

Biography 
Was born on 29 August 1982 in the Hungarian town Kiskunmajsa. Her father Andrei Pupenin served in the Soviet Army, located in Hungary, and her mother worked as a professor at Herzen University.

In 1986, the family moved to Lake Baikal, then to Tula, finally settling in Leningrad (now St. Petersburg) in 1987. In 1996, after graduating from high school with specializations in mathematics and music (harp), that same year she joined the Imagine drama school, and  joined the Shukin Theatre School under Valentina Nikolaenko.

From 2006 to 2011, was an actress for the Sovremennik Theater Company in Moscow.

Personal life 
On 7 June 2008, Aleksandrova married fellow actor Ivan Stebunov. They divorced in 2010. After that she had a relationship with actor Alexander Domogarov. On 11 July 2012, she gave birth to a son. The child's name is Andrey, just after his father - a TV director Andrey Boltenko. Aleksandrova gave birth to her second child on 26 September 2015 - a daughter named Yekaterina.

Filmography

References

External links 

1982 births
Living people
People from Kiskunmajsa
Russian child actresses
Russian film actresses
Russian television actresses
Russian stage actresses
20th-century Russian actresses
21st-century Russian actresses
Russian television presenters
Honored Artists of the Russian Federation
Russian women television presenters